Fever Lake (originally titled Demon Kid) is an American direct-to-video horror film that was released in 1997. It stars Corey Haim, Mario López and Bo Hopkins. Filming occurred in Kenosha County, Wisconsin.

Plot
A group of teenagers visit a lake with intentions to spend the weekend there. Despite warnings from the locals, the group continues with their weekend plan and soon discover the lake is cursed.

Release and legacy
In America, Fever Lake premiered on October 9, 1997 at a gala invite-only charity event in Kenosha, where it had been filmed. It would be released direct-to-video a few days later, in time for Halloween 1997. Producer Jim Kreutzer stated in an August 1997 interview that “We always knew this was a straight-to-video release." Fever Lake was the subject of a 2015 RiffTrax satirical commentary track.

Filming locations
Carthage College, Kenosha, Wisconsin, United States
Twin Lakes, Wisconsin, United States

References

External links

1997 films
American teen horror films
1997 horror films
American slasher films
Films scored by Robert J. Walsh
1990s English-language films
1990s American films